Roy Abernethy (September 29, 1906, Pennsylvania – February 28, 1977, Jupiter, Florida) was an executive in the American automobile industry, serving as CEO of American Motors Corporation (AMC) from February 1962 to January 1967. Prior to his tenure at AMC, Abernethy had been with Packard Motors and Willys-Overland. Abernethy replaced George W. Romney, who resigned from AMC to become Governor of Michigan.

Background 
Roy Abernethy was a native of Monterey, Pennsylvania, and his first job was caring for coal‐mine mules. He moved to Pittsburgh to become an apprentice mechanic and he also took night courses in engineering at the Carnegie Institute of Technology. He began his automotive industry career in 1926 as an apprentice mechanic at luxury automaker, Packard, earning 18 cents per hour. He then moved up establishing success in auto sales, reaching US$1,000,000 in Packard vehicles in a single year from his dealership in Hartford, Connecticut. Abernethy also held the post of vice president of sales at Willys.

Changing AMC 
American Motors was formed from the merger of Nash Motors and Hudson Motor Car Company, and the company hired Abernethy in 1954. During AMC's formative years, the company struggled with costs and sales. Abernethy became vice president of sales and concentrated on building AMC's sales and distribution network. He recognized that promotion and advertising are useless without a strong dealer organization, so his first task was to convert every Hudson and Nash dealer into an AMC dealer. He then kept many of these dealers allied with AMC, thus helping to keep the corporation afloat, until AMC found its compact car niche under Romney's leadership. He was known to fly  a year to make AMC synonymous with the compact car. Abernethy achieved sales successes for the company and by 1962, Rambler was number three in sales rank among all the brands of cars sold in the United States.

The "rigidly conservative" Romney resigned from running AMC in February 1962, to be elected governor of Michigan. On February 12, 1962, the AMC board of directors selected the 56-year-old Abernethy to replace Romney. This was the first time the company had separated the position of president from the chairperson of the board. Abernethy became responsible for day-to-day operations as president, while Richard E. Cross, the automaker's legal counsel and new chairman, was now called AMC's Chief Executive Officer.

Both took command of a financially strong company (working capital increased from a low of $46 million in 1957, to $103 million, and the firm eliminated all long-term debt), with sales increasing from $362 million (91,469 automobiles) in 1957, to more than $1 billion (422,273 total units) in 1960. Abernethy predicted a total of 450,000 Ramblers to be delivered for the 1962 year, despite increasing competition from the new domestic-made compact cars offered by the Big Three. However, Abernethy "was more or less given an anchor and told to swim" after taking over the automaker from Romney. He "may lack some of the eloquence of his predecessor, George Romney, who revived the company in the late 1950s, but he makes up for it with vocal volume." One of the first tasks for the small automaker was to make its capital work harder in the face of competition with the automotive giants.

Abernethy continued Romney's prohibition on automobile racing, which had been instituted by the Automobile Manufacturers Association (AMA) in 1957. He made AMC observe both the letter and spirit of AMA's resolution, and was against a renewal of the auto industry's horsepower race by offering ever more powerful engines, as well as corporate sponsorship of activities that glamorize speed and performance. AMC's market performance reached record levels in 1964, placing the Rambler brand in third-place position in the domestic sales race. At the same time AMC publicly disavowed any interest in automobile competition. Corporate advertising answered the question "Why don't we enter high-performance Rambler V-8s in racing?" with "Because the only race Rambler cares about is the human race." The "messianic fervor with which both former AMC president George Romney and his successor, Roy Abernethy, spread the message of fundamental motoring" helped solidify the image of the "Rambler driver" - a market segment that finds "any forms of performance repugnant." Nevertheless, in mid-1963 AMC announced a new  V8 option in the Rambler Classic models (which were previously available only with I6 engines, and the V8s reserved for the Ambassador line) as well as made a partial attempt to tap into the rapidly growing muscle and performance car image by introducing the sporty Rambler Marlin midway in the 1965 model year. The mid-sized fastback model made the public "aware of changes in Rambler's styling - the reaction is favorable."

However, Abernethy is now known for reversing Romney's plans for AMC that involved maximum parts compatibility for all lines of AMC vehicles. Abernethy was a big man of  — smoking ten corona cigars a day — and had big ideas for the company. He was convinced that with the right marketing AMC could take on the “Big Three” ([Ford, Chevy, and Plymouth, the Low priced big three]) model for model, if the company could shed its "economy car" reputation. Chevy was able to introduce the Caprice, Ford the LTD, and Plymouth the Fury VIP. In contrast to Romney, who thought only of compacts, as the automaker's new head, "Abernethy looked at the company's volume and decided it meant that AMC should go toe-to-toe with Ford, Chevy & Plymouth."

Abernethy said repeatedly that AMC's "main problem was its image lag — the fact that too many people still thought of American Motors as the builder of plain jane compacts." He also started to move the Ambassador upscale to compete with other manufacturers' full-size cars. Moreover, larger models typically return bigger profits. Offering larger, and often more prestigious or "halo cars", can also help make the firm's smaller models look more attractive to consumers. Thus, as part of this vision, Abernethy put into motion a total remake of AMC's corporate identity and its marketing mix that would divorce its larger car lines from its Rambler brand and his perceived "negative" compact car image.

The first models with Abernethy's corporate strategy "in the business world's toughest race — the grinding contest against the Big Three automobile makers" were the cars introduced for the 1965 model year. They were called the "Sensible Spectaculars," with the new Ambassador billed as "a whole new horizon in size, style, stunning performance" for 1965. The 1965 models were a major makeover of the completely new platform that had just been introduced in 1963. American Motors' new cars included the stretched and more luxurious Ambassadors, as well as new convertibles for the large models. New styling, the more powerful engines, as well as numerous comfort and sports-type options, were now emphasized. Abernethy even switched the automaker's advertising agency to promote "a better luxury and sports car image". However, Abernethy had his critics, who contended that AMC "had its great success when it was doing what the Big Three weren't doing".

The strategy shift at first seemed to be working, because sales of the redesigned 1965 and 1966 Ambassadors improved, even as AMC's overall production decreased from the record level achieved in 1963. However, corporate earnings per share were a meager 27 cents per share, the lowest since AMC made its famous compact car comeback in 1958. Investors received a message of the changing fortune of the automaker when the company's 1966 annual financial report was delivered in a plain brown wrapper, instead of the previous year's glossy cover.

A completely new design was also slated for the larger 1967 models. This strategy added $60 million in retooling costs, which was a major stretch for the company. The objective was to position the 1967 AMC Rebel and Ambassador designs on an equal basis with competitive models marketed by the Big Three Economy Brands, Ford, Chevy and Plymouth. The new 1967 models also came with completely modern "GEN-2" AMC V8 engines. The media was positive in covering the new models, with experts such as Tom McCahill highly praising the new car's performance and ride comfort.

The results 
The evidence suggests that Abernethy was correct in making the Ambassadors more upscale with the new models that combined luxurious packaging and reasonable size; sales jumped from 18,647 in 1964 to over 64,000 in 1965. In 1966 they went to more than 71,000.

However, there were serious problems. The costs of developing the new cars and engines meant managers now had problems in securing working capital to keep the company going. American Motors' automobile sales dropped twenty percent in the first half of 1966, and the firm reported a fiscal six-month loss of $4.2 million on sales of $479 million. The situation was so bad that Robert B. Evans invested more than US$2 million because AMC's stock was selling for only 60 percent of the company's net worth; thus he became its largest stockholder and was named its chairman.

Abernethy was spending so much money that it was difficult for the company to turn a profit even with the jump in sales in 1965 and 1966. Rumors started to have a snowball effect on the company. With the company's financial health and future in question, even an extra-long engine warranty appeared to be not enough to instill confidence among consumers.

The last quarter sales for AMC ended September 30, 1966 (AMC was not on a calendar fiscal year) were disappointing. AMC recorded a balance sheet loss of $12,648,000 for the year before Tax Credits and deferred Tax Assets. The 1965 and 1966 Ambassadors represented a crossroad in AMC's history, one at which some historians would say it took the wrong turn.

The company changed leaders from the likes of Romney, who defined the compact car segment, to that of Abernethy, "a likeable super salesman who unfortunately landed at the top as the market began to quickly change." He discounted the obvious industry trend toward youthful performance models. Even with the Big Three entering AMC's market niche, Abernethy insisted that the compact car revolution was not over and predicted the automaker would sell 550,000 units in 1964, and that the total market would increase from 2.6 to 3 million compact-sized cars. However, Abernethy presumed that customers needed more choices among those available from the Big Three with their new models in the compact car market. American Motors did not have deep resources and market power.

The Kaiser-Frazer Corporation also tried unsuccessfully to challenge the Big Three market leaders in their existing product segments. In 1965, the Kaiser family decided to sell the Jeep operations and charged Stephen Girard to find a buyer. He was friends with Roy D. Chapin, Jr., and lobbied AMC's president to buy the light utility vehicle business. A tentative deal with Girard fell apart when Henry Kaiser demanded a steeper price and Abernethy refused.

In the five years of Abernethy's tenure as president, the company went from a profitable operation to a losing one. Abernethy was forced to "drop out of management team" by taking an "early retirement" from the company on January 9, 1967. With him went Evans who was replaced as president by William V. Luneburg, AMC's group vice president of automotive operations. Abernethy remained for a time on the company's board after his resignation as president, stepping down at the same time as president of the Automobile Manufacturers Association.

After the departure of Abernethy, AMC's new management team decided to enter motorsports to gain exposure, publicity, and develop a "performance" image. The automaker joined the domestic Big Three's “Race on Sunday, Sell on Monday” philosophy. A new position, Performance Activities Director, with Carl Chamakian, was established to get AMC automobiles into racing and attract a younger customer base during the height of the muscle car era.

Legacy 
Abernethy had two children, a son, Lee Roy Abernethy (retired as a senior vice president at the Bank of New York, was a consultant to the Bank of Taiwan), and a daughter, Phyliss Abernethy Hendry.

He died in Jupiter, Florida, where he had spent the decade after leaving AMC. He was remembered as heading the automaker "in the stormy post-Romney '60s" and as "big, gregarious... first, last and always a salesman." Abernethy also "had a reputation for tempering his immense personal drive with considerateness for others, and he seemed to thrive on tough challenges."

Award 
In 1971, Abernethy received the "Distinguished Service" citation from the Automotive Hall of Fame. He was recognized for his work at Packard and Willys-Overland as well as his "valuable qualities that led him to top management and leadership at American Motors Corporation."

References 

1906 births
1977 deaths
20th-century American businesspeople
American chief executives of manufacturing companies
American chief executives in the automobile industry
American Motors people
Packard people